Raneem is a given name. Notable people with the name include:

 Raneem El-Gedawy (born 1997), Egyptian basketball player
 Raneem El Weleily (born 1989), Egyptian squash player

Masculine given names